George Louis Wheeler  (born George L. Heroux, August 3, 1869  – March 23, 1946) was a professional baseball pitcher. He played all or part of four seasons in Major League Baseball from 1896 to 1899 for the Philadelphia Phillies.
Wheeler, primarily a right-handed pitcher, threw left-handed on a handful of occasions to become one of the few known "switch pitchers" in MLB history.

References

External links

1869 births
1943 deaths
19th-century baseball players
Major League Baseball pitchers
Philadelphia Phillies players
USC Trojans baseball coaches
People from Methuen, Massachusetts
Sportspeople from Essex County, Massachusetts
Baseball players from Massachusetts
Lewiston (minor league baseball) players
Manchester Gazettes players
Lawrence (minor league baseball) players
Bangor Millionaires players
Rome Romans players
Milwaukee Brewers (minor league) players
Syracuse Stars (minor league baseball) players
Los Angeles (minor league baseball) players
Los Angeles Angels (minor league) players
San Francisco Seals (baseball) players
Minor league baseball managers